Hutcherson is a surname. Notable people with the surname include:

Bobby Hutcherson (1941–2016), American jazz vibraphonist and marimbist
Dick Hutcherson (1931–2005), American businessman and a former stock car racer
Jenelle Hutcherson, American hair artist, activist, public figure, designer, youth mentor and visionary
Josh Hutcherson (born 1992), American film and television actor
Ken Hutcherson (born 1952), former American football linebacker in the National Football League
Ron Hutcherson (born 1943), former NASCAR Cup Series driver
Sadarius Hutcherson (born 1998), American football player
Solomon Hutcherson (born 1972), American mixed martial arts fighter
Warren Hutcherson (born 1963), veteran comedian and comedy writer from Baltimore, Maryland